Yannick Bourseaux (born 18 February 1975) is a French competitor in Paralympic biathlon, cross-country skiing and paratriathlon.

Before the accident that paralysed his arm, he was an elite able-bodied triathlete on the French National triathlon team.

Bourseaux competed in biathlon and cross-country skiing in the Torino (2006) and Vancouver (2010) Winter Paralympics but did not win any medals.

He won the TRI 4 (arm impairment) paratriathlon title at the ITU Triathlon World Championships in 2011 and 2012 and came second to Paralympic swimmer Martin Schultz in 2013.

After defending his TRI 4 title at the 2012 ITU Paratriathlon World Championships, Bourseaux was named International Paralympic Committee "Athlete of the Month".

References

External links 
 Yannick Bourseaux's website
 
 

1975 births
Living people
French male biathletes
French male triathletes
Paralympic biathletes of France
Paralympic cross-country skiers of France
Paratriathletes of France
Biathletes at the 2006 Winter Paralympics
Biathletes at the 2010 Winter Paralympics
Cross-country skiers at the 2006 Winter Paralympics
Cross-country skiers at the 2010 Winter Paralympics
People from Montluçon
Sportspeople from Allier
20th-century French people
21st-century French people